Volodymyrska Street is a street in the center of Kyiv, the capital of Ukraine, which is named after the prince of Kievan Rus' Vladimir the Great and which is one of the oldest streets in the city, and arguably among the oldest constantly inhabited residential street in Europe. There are many educational, culture and government institutions on this street, as well as historical monuments. Four buildings from Volodymyrska Street are depicted on reverses of Ukrainian hryvnia banknotes (Saint Sophia's Cathedral on 2 hryvnias, Tsentralna Rada building on 50 hryvnias, Red University Building on 100 hryvnias and building of the Presidium of the National Academy of Sciences of Ukraine on 1000 hryvnias).

History

10th to 18th centuries 
Volodymyrska Street is one of the oldest in Kyiv. The part of the street between Church of the Tithes and Sofiyska Gate appeared not later than the end of the 10th century. After construction of Saint Sophia's Cathedral at the beginning of the 11th century and Golden Gate around 1037, the street was enlarged to reach both of them and became the main street of the city, which was going through the City of Volodymyr and the City of Yaroslav, which are the oldest parts of Kyiv. Also Irynynsky Church, Georgivsky Cathedral and St. Theodore Monastery were constructed on the street, as well as houses for both the nobility and usual people.

After Kyiv was ruined during Mongol invasion of Rus', the street remained in ruins long after. In the 17th century, Saint Sophia's Cathedral was reconstructed and a chapel was built on the place, where Church of the Tithes was. The upper half of Volodymyrska Street became a part of Old Kyiv Fortress. After a long break, at the end of the 18th century, intensive construction started on the part of the street below the Golden Gate. The remains of Kievan Rus' defence walls and Old Kyiv Fortress were demolished.

19th century 
After expansion of Kyiv in 1830s the street was expanded far south. In 1837-1842 Red University Building was constructed. From this moment the modern look of the street started to appear. Several 1-2 floor buildings were constructed, followed by 3-5 buildings. Many hotels and administrative, community and residential building buildings were constructed. On the place where remains of Irynynsky Church were found, the St. Irene Column was erected from the ancient stone, which stood till the 1930s. At the end of the 19th century sett was put on the street, gas and later electric lighting appeared. In 1895 the tram line was constructed on the street.

20th century 

At the beginning of the 20th century, the new city theatre was constructed to replace the old one, which suffered from fire. A revenue house on the corner with Prorizna Street was also built, which is now a valuable place of interest in Kyiv; Pedagogical museum building, which will be the seat of the Central Council of Ukraine; Olgynska gymnasium building, which is now the seat of Presidium of the National Academy of Sciences of Ukraine; zemstvo building, which is now the seat of the Security Service of Ukraine.

There were no major constructions on the street during the rest of the century, apart from construction of the building for the National Museum of the History of Ukraine. Nowadays, Volodymyrska street is one of the most important streets in Kyiv. It is also a very important tourist site due to historical monuments of the 11th to 19th centuries, including an archaeological complex on Starokyivska Hill at the top of the street.

Places of interest on the street 
Notable cultural and historical monuments, institutions on the street from north to south:
 St Andrew's Church
 National Museum of the History of Ukraine
 Remains of the Church of the Tithes
 Embassy of Uzbekistan in Kyiv
 Kyiv department of the State Emergency Service of Ukraine
 Kyiv department of the National Police of Ukraine
 Court of Appeal of Kyiv Oblast
 Bohdan Khmelnytsky Monument
 Saint Sophia's Cathedral
 Security Service of Ukraine
 State Border Guard Service of Ukraine
 Golden Gate
 Embassy of Armenia in Kyiv
 National Opera of Ukraine
 Leonardo Business Center
 Presidium of the National Academy of Sciences of Ukraine
 Teacher's House (former building of Central Council of Ukraine)
 Maksymovych Scientific Library
 Red University Building of the Taras Shevchenko National University of Kyiv
 Division of the Vernadsky National Library of Ukraine
 Taras Shevchenko Park
 Administration of the Taras Shevchenko National University of Kyiv
 National University of Food Technologies
 European Union delegation to Ukraine

People 

 Ivan Nechuy-Levytsky - writer (lived in house #7)
 Amvrosy Buchma - actor and director (lived in house #14)
 Vasyl Kasiyan - artist (lived in house #14)
 Nikolai Leskov - novelist, short-story writer, playwright, and journalist (worked in house #15)
 Mikhail Ikonnikov - architect (lived in house #18/2)
 Mykhailo Hrushevsky - academician, politician, historian, and statesman (gave speeches from balcony of house #21, worked in houses #35 and #57)
 Volodymyr Zabolotny - architect (lived in house #22)
 Vladimir Korolenko - short story writer, journalist, human rights activist and humanitarian (lived in house #24b)
 Mykhailo Kotsiubynsky - writer (lived in house #28)
 Viktor Vasnetsov - artist (lived in house #32)
 Boris Balinsky - biologist, embryologist and entomologist (lived in house #36)
 Alexander Vertinsky - artist, poet, singer, composer, cabaret artist and actor (born in house #43)
 Mykola Murashko - painter and art teacher (lived in houses #46 and 47)
 Mikhail Tereshchenko - landowner, owner of several sugar factories, and financier (lived in house #51a)
 Vladimir Vernadsky, Vladimir Lipsky, Danylo Zabolotny, Alexander Bogomolets, Aleksandr Palladin - scientists (worked in house #54)
 Volodymyr Vynnychenko - statesman, political activist, writer, playwright, artist (worked in house #57)
 Symon Petliura - publicist, writer, journalist, politician, statesman (worked in house #57)
 Alexander Blok - lyrical poet (born in house #79)

Also a lot of notable people studied or worked in Imperial University of St. Volodymyr (now Taras Shevchenko National University of Kyiv), which is situated on Volodymyrska street.

Gallery

References 

 
Streets in Kyiv